The 2004 Kufa mosque bombing occurred on August 26, 2004 when the main mosque in Kufa, Iraq was hit by a barrage of mortar rounds. 

The mortar rounds struck the mosque, killing 74 people, and injuring 315. Weeks before the attack happened there had been heavy fighting between U.S. forces and fighters loyal to Muqtada al-Sadr around Kufa, and Najaf. As a result of the shelling, the U.S. halted all operations around the area for 24 hours.

External links

 Dozens die in Iraq mosque bombing BBC News

2004 murders in Iraq
21st-century mass murder in Iraq
Terrorist incidents in Iraq in 2004
Mass murder in 2004
August 2004 events in Iraq
History of Kufa